Pay Tavah (also Romanized as Pāy Tāvah and Pāy-e Tāveh; also known as Pātāveh) is a village in Jenah Rural District, Jenah District, Bastak County, Hormozgan Province, Iran. At the 2006 census, its population was 261, in 53 families.

References 

Populated places in Bastak County